Erigeron disparipilus is a North American species of flowering plants in the family Asteraceae known by the common name white cushion fleabane. It is found in Oregon, Washington, and Idaho in the northwestern United States.

Erigeron disparipilus is a perennial herb up to 12 cm (4.8 inches) tall. Most of the leaves are generally clustered around the bases of the stems. Each stem generally has only one flower head, with 30–60 white ray florets surrounding numerous yellow disc florets.

References

disparipilus
Flora of the Northwestern United States
Plants described in 1947
Flora without expected TNC conservation status
Taxa named by Arthur Cronquist